Charles Gaudichaud-Beaupré (September 4, 1789 – January 16, 1854) was a French botanist.

Biography
Gaudichaud was born in Angoulême, to J-J. Gaudichaud and Rose (Mallat) Gaudichaud. He studied pharmacology informally at Cognac and Angoulême, and then under Robiquet in Paris, where he acquired a knowledge of botany from Desfontaines and Louis Richard. In April 1810 he was appointed pharmacist in the military marine, and from July 1811 to the end of 1814 he served in Antwerp. He also studied chemistry and herbology.

His greatest claim to fame was serving as botanist on a circumglobal expedition from 1817 to 1820.  He accompanied Freycinet, who made the expedition on the ships Uranie and Physicienne. The wreck of the Uranie in the Falkland Islands, at the close of 1819, deprived him of more than half the botanical collections he had made in various parts of the world. He is also known for his collections in Australia.

In 1831 Gaudichaud sailed on L'Herminie to South America, visiting Chile, Brazil and Peru. In 1836 he undertook a third voyage, circumnavigating the globe on La Bonite.

He died in Paris.

Legacy
Gaudichaud is commemorated in the scientific names of two species of South American lizards, Ecpleopus gaudichaudii and the Chilean marked gecko. Two Hawaiian species of flowering plant, in the genus Scaevola are named after him, Scaevola gaudichaudiana, and Scaevola gaudichaudii .
As well as a genus of plants (in the family Malpighiaceae) Gaudichaudia which comes from South America.

He wrote various treatises, with memoirs on potato blight, the multiplication of bulbous plants, the increase in diameter of dicotyledonous plants, and other subjects.

Principal works
Flore des îles Malouines (Flora of the Falkland Islands)
Mémoire sur les Cycadées (Treatise on the Cycads)
Voyage de l'Uranie (Voyage of the Uranus)
Lettre sur l'organographie et la physiologie, addressed to Monsieur de Mirbel, in Archives de Botanique, T. II, 1833 (Letter on Oceanography and Physiology)
Recherches générales sur l'organographie (General Research on Oceanography)
Mémoire sur le Cissus hydrophora (Treatise on Cissus hydrophora)
Voyage Autour du Monde Executé pendant les années 1836 et 1837 sur la corvette La Bonite (Voyage of the Bonita)
Notes relatives à l'organographie et à la physiologie des végétaux monocotylés

References

External links 
 Voyage de l'Uranie, Botanique At: Biodiversity Heritage Library
 Charles Gaudichaud-Beaupré | Botanical Cabinet

1789 births
1854 deaths
Members of the French Academy of Sciences
Botanists active in Australia
French phycologists
Bryologists
Pteridologists
Botanists with author abbreviations
19th-century French botanists
French mycologists